Bourke Place is a  skyscraper situated at 600 Bourke Street, Melbourne central business district, Victoria, Australia. It is the equal 11th tallest building in Melbourne and the 25th tallest building in Australia. It was completed in 1991.

Designed by the architectural firm Godfrey & Spowers, it is a modernist building. It previously served as the headquarters for BHP, and the company's sign on the outside of the structure was the highest in the country. BHP has since moved to a new building across the city to 171 Collins Street.

The building's most obvious feature on the skyline is its sloped roof, which hides various communications equipment.

In 2019 the building's ground floor foyer has undergone refurbishment under the guidance of 3XN in collaboration with NH Architecture with construction work carried out by Probuild.

Bourke Place is home to numerous law firms, including King & Wood Mallesons, which occupies the top eleven floors, Sparke Helmore Lawyers, Gadens, and Lander & Rogers. Other tenants include M&K Lawyers, Berkshire Hathaway, Scottish Pacific and Interpro.

See also

 Australian landmarks
 List of tallest buildings in Melbourne
 List of tallest buildings in Australia

References

External links
 Emporis Buildings: Bourke Place
 Official Website: Bourke Place

Skyscrapers in Melbourne
Office buildings in Melbourne
Brookfield Properties buildings
1991 establishments in Australia
Skyscraper office buildings in Australia
Office buildings completed in 1991
Bourke Street
Buildings and structures in Melbourne City Centre